Final Fantasy VII: The First Soldier was a free-to-play battle royale game released for Android and iOS on November 17, 2021. The game was published by Square Enix and developed in partnership with Ateam Entertainment Inc. The First Soldier is a part of the Compilation of Final Fantasy VII, a collection of spin-offs related to the original Final Fantasy VII, released in 1997. Set 30 years before the events of Final Fantasy VII, the game takes place in the world of Midgar as players take on the role of SOLDIER candidates in a battle-for-survival simulation. Citing a failure to deliver their intended experience, Square Enix shut down the game's servers in January 2023.

Development 
In February 2021, Square Enix announced Final Fantasy VII: The First Soldier along with another game, Final Fantasy VII: Ever Crisis. Square Enix developed this game as a collaboration with Ateam Entertainment Inc. along with others to contribute to the greater Compilation of Final Fantasy VII. The game was released for iOS and Android app stores on November 17, 2021.

Gameplay 
Final Fantasy VII: The First Soldier was a battle royale mobile game that has players take on the role of a SOLDIER candidate. The First Soldier allowed up to 75 players to participate in a match. It combined battle royale style play with elements from the original 1997 game Final Fantasy VII, including rideable chocobos, magic, moogles and materia. Players were also able to customize their characters and utilize eight different battle styles (also referred to as jobs/classes). The eight styles players could use were Trickster, Machinist, Dragoon, Warrior, Sorcerer, Ninja, Monk and Ranger.

Shutdown 
In Autumn of 2022, Square Enix began operations to close The First Soldier, citing the inability to deliver on their intended experience as the main reason for termination. The game continued operation until January 11, 2023.

References

External links
 

Role-playing video games
Android (operating system) games
Final Fantasy video games
IOS games
Inactive online games
Wikipedia Student Program
Video games set on fictional planets
2021 video games
Products and services discontinued in 2023
Compilation of Final Fantasy VII
Video games developed in Japan